Jaidev Kumar is an Indian musician and producer, who was born in Delhi but who moved to Mumbai in 2000.  He has been working in the Punjabi music industry since 1999. His first hit album was "Dil Le Gayi Kudi Gujrat Di". He is the son of music director K Panna Lal.

Television

Filmography as Music Composer/Producer
 Jee Aayan Nu
 Asa Nu Maan Watna Da (2004)
 Des Hoyaa Pardes
 Mel Karade Rabba (2010)
 Sukhmani - Hope for Life
 Chak Jawana
 Yaara o Dildaara
 Taur Mittran Di
 Dharti (2011)
 Yaaran Naal Baharan
 Khushiyaan
 Waris Shah: Ishq Daa Waaris
 Love Exchange (film)
 Tera Mera Ki Rishta
 Pata Nahi Rabb Kehdeyan Rangan Ch Raazi
 Mannat
 Yaariyan (2008)
 Saadi Love Story
 Dil Tainu Karda Hai Pyar
 Chardi Jawani
 Vaisakhi List
 Channa Mereya (film) 
 Aate Di Chidi (2018)
Jindua 
Daana Paani 
Shareek
Ishqedaariya
Sweeti Weds NRI
Kala Shah Kala
Rangeelay
Motor Mittran Di
Kaptaan
Haani
25 Kille
Gaddar
High End Yaariyaan 
Khedo Khundi
Bajatey Raho (2013)
Munda Faridkotiya
Chaar Sahibzaade (2014)
Mini Punjab
Banda Singh Bahadur
Behen Hogi Teri (2017)
Dangar Doctor
Rabb Da Radio
Veerey Di Wedding 
Aate Di Chidi
Mr.&Mrs 420
Sahib Biwi Aur Gangster
Blackia
Santa Banta Pvt Ltd.
Wah Taj
Subedar Joginder Singh 
Yaariyaan
 Bajre Da Sitta (2022)
 Code Name: Tiranga (2022)

Albums as music producer
 Oye Hoye – Harbhajan Mann
 Amrit Da Batta – Harbhajan Mann
 Lala Lala Lala – Harbhajan Mann
 Nachlai – Harbhajan Mann
 Haaye Meri Billo – Harbhajan Mann
 Satrangi Peengh – Harbhajan Mann
 Dil Dol Gaya – Harbhajan Mann
 Boot Polishan – Gurdas Maan
 Punjeeri – Gurdas Maan
 Vaari Vaari – Harbhajan Mann
 Jogiya – Gurdas Maan
 Dil Lai Gayee – Jasbir Jassi
 O HO! – Sardool Sikander
 Os Kudi Ne – Sardool Sikander
 Nakhra Janab Da – Sardool Sikander
 21st Chapter of Hans Raj Hans – Hans Raj Hans
 Kudi Kudi – Jasbir Jassi
 Nishani Payar Di – Jasbir Jassi
 Mukhda Chan Warga – Jasbir Jassi
 Rabbi – Rabbi Shergill
 Saaun Di Jhadi – Babbu Mann
 Jaan – Jeet Jagjit
 Teri Meri Ik Jind – various singers
 Chorni – Hans Raj Hans
 Ghama Di Raat – Hans Raj Hans
 Roiyaan'' – Farhan Saeed

References

External links 
 PlanetPunjab.com – Punjabi website

Year of birth missing (living people)
Living people
People from Jalandhar
Film directors from Delhi
Indian music video directors